South Woodford, originally George Lane, is a London Underground station in the suburb of South Woodford in East London. It is on the Epping branch of the Central line, between Snaresbrook and Woodford stations and is in Travelcard Zone 4.

History

The station opened on 22 August 1856 as part of the Eastern Counties Railway branch to Loughton which opened that day. Originally named George Lane, the station was renamed twice: South Woodford (George Lane) on 5 July 1937; and South Woodford on 14 December 1947. The station formed part of the Great Eastern Railway's system until that company amalgamated with other railways to create the London and North Eastern Railway (LNER) in 1923. On 5 July 1937 the station was renamed "South Woodford (George Lane)".

The station was subsequently transferred to form part of London Underground's Central line on 14 December 1947 when Central line services were extended from Leytonstone to Woodford. This formed a part of the long planned, and delayed, Eastern Extension of the Central line that was part of the London Passenger Transport Board's "New Works Programme" of 1935 – 1940. After transferring to London Underground the "(George Lane)" suffix fell out of use, though it remains on some roundel signs.

During the planning of the Victoria line, route options included a continuation of the line from Walthamstow Central to Woodford or South Woodford stations. However, in 1961, the decision was taken to build only as far as Walthamstow Central.

The station today
The station has two entrances, one on each side of the line. George Lane originally crossed the railway tracks with a level crossing immediately to the north of the station, but this was closed and the road split into two when the line was electrified. The footbridge can be used without a ticket as, unusually for stations on the Epping branch, the footbridge is outside the ticket gateline. For some years the station had step-free access to and from the eastbound platform only. The ramp to the westbound platform was installed and opened in March 2019, making the station fully step-free.

Station improvements
The station underwent considerable renovations in 2006, 150 years after it opened. Five new CCTV cameras were installed in the station underpass with the intention of improving security as, in addition to the multimillion-pound station refurbishment work being undertaken, crime statistics showed South Woodford station had the highest record of violent crime in Redbridge and the underpass was seen as a security risk, particularly after dark. The rebuilding of the section of westbound platform damaged by fire was also completed and the paint scheme was a mix of white, blue and orange. However, the footbridge over the tracks at the east end was not repainted.

Services and connections
Train frequencies vary throughout the day, but generally operate every 3–7 minutes between 07:03 and 22:39 eastbound and between 06:22 and 22:19 westbound.

London Bus routes 179, 549, W12, W13 and W14, and night route N55 serve the station.

Notes and references

Notes

References

Bibliography

 

Tube stations in the London Borough of Redbridge
Former Great Eastern Railway stations
Railway stations in Great Britain opened in 1856
Central line (London Underground) stations
London Underground Night Tube stations
Proposed Chelsea-Hackney Line stations